Woodcutter may refer to:
 A gatherer of firewood
 A lumberjack
 An artist producing woodcuts

Fictional characters
 The children's father in Hansel and Gretel, a German fairy tale collected by the Brothers Grimm
 The title character in The Honest Woodcutter, one of Aesop's Fables
 A title character in The Tale of the Woodcutter and his Daughters, an Egyptian folktale
 A character in Tulisa, the Wood-Cutter's Daughter, an Indian folktale
 The title character in The Woodcutter and the Trees, a complex of fables of West Asian and Greek origin

Other uses
 Secret Service code name for Henry Kissinger (born 1923), American politician and diplomat

See also
 Woodcutters, a 1984 German novel by Thomas Bernhard